Easy Go may refer to:

 Easy Go (novel), a 1968 novel by John Lange (Michael Crichton)
 "Easy Go" (song), a 2016 song by Grandtheft and Delaney Jane
 EasyGo, a toll-collection technology in Europe
 EasyGO, an electronic fare card used by Grand River Transit

See also
 Easy Come Easy Go (disambiguation)
 E-Z-GO, an American golf cart manufacturer